Mark "Marky" Hernández (born 7 August 1996) is an American soccer player who plays as a midfielder for Northern Colorado Hailstorm FC in USL League One.

Career

Chattanooga Red Wolves
Prior to the 2020 season, Hernández moved to USL League One club Chattanooga Red Wolves SC. He made his league debut for the club on 25 July 2020, playing the entirety of a 2–2 away draw with Tormenta FC.

On 11 January 2022, Hernández signed with League One expansion club Northern Colorado Hailstorm FC.

References

External links
Mark Hernández at USL Championship Official Website
Mark Hernández at Reno 1868 FC
Mark Hernández at Cal State Fullerton Athletics

1996 births
Living people
Cal State Fullerton Titans men's soccer players
FC Golden State Force players
Orange County SC U-23 players
Reno 1868 FC players
Chattanooga Red Wolves SC players
Northern Colorado Hailstorm FC players
USL League Two players
USL League One players
American soccer players
Soccer players from Anaheim, California
Association football midfielders
Golden West Rustlers men's soccer players